Limnellia anna is a species of shore flies in the family Ephydridae.

Distribution
Canada, United States.

References

Ephydridae
Diptera of North America
Insects described in 1935
Taxa named by Ezra Townsend Cresson